The EDAG Biwak is an estate concept car from the EDAG (Engineering + Design AG) firm based on the Volkswagen New Beetle. The EDAG Biwak appears as a sport utility vehicle or a two-door estate car with the body of the Volkswagen New Beetle. In the Geneva Auto Show in 2006, it appeared as a concept car.

Cars of Germany
Volkswagen concept vehicles